Katzenstein Castle is one of the oldest remaining Hohenstaufen castles in Germany. It is located in a borough that shares its name with the castle in the Dischingen municipality of the Heidenheim district of Baden-Württemberg. The castle is open to visitors and contains several dining rooms as well as hotel rooms.

Location
This hill castle is located in the valley of a tributary of the Egau river on the Härtsfeld in Heidenheim district near an old Roman road running from Faimingen in Lauingen to Bopfingen known as the Frankensträßle.

History
In 1099, the Lords von Cassenstein were first mentioned.  The family was a ministerial or unfree knightly family in the service of the Graf (or Count) von Dillingen. In 1262, Edlen von Hürnheim was listed as the owner of the castle von Katzenstein when it was sold by Hermann von Hürnheim-Katzenstein.

Ownership changed again in 1354 when the Graf von Oettingen acquired the castle.  He quickly pawned the castle on the Graf von Helfenstein, who gave the castle to Berthold von Westerstetten in 1382.  In 1572, the Katzenstein line wiped out the Westerstetten line.  The inheritance of the Westerstetten family was sold again to the von Oettingen family.

The castle was burned to the ground by French soldiers in 1648, at the end of the Thirty Years' War. The castle was rebuilt in 1669.

Burg Katzenstein went to the Oettingen-Wallenstein line in 1798. Later, in 1810, the castle was taken over by the state of Württemberg and placed under the district of Neresheim.

Since 1939, the castle has been privately owned.

Sights
In 1973, the St Laurentius chapel was opened and cleaning began.  Under the dirt and partially completed Baroque paintings, impressive Mediaeval paintings were discovered. The fresco paintings date from 1250 to 1280 and show the transition from Romanesque art to early Gothic art.

See also
List of castles in Baden-Württemberg

References

Further reading 
  Max Müller, Gerhard Taddey (Hrsg.): Handbuch der historischen Stätten Deutschlands, Band Baden-Württemberg. Kröner, Stuttgart 2. Aufl. 1980. 
  Michael-Nikolaus-Nomidis Walter, Burgverwalter Burg Katzenstein: Geschichte und Beschreibung der Burg Katzenstein. MissionsDruckerei&Verlag Mariannhill, Reimlingen

External links

  Burg Katzenstein (in German)
  Dischingen Town website
  Hohenstaufen trail

Historic house museums in Baden-Württemberg
Ministeriales